3d Reconnaissance Squadron may refer to:
 The 6th Tactical Missile Squadron, designated the 3d Reconnaissance Squadron (Medium) from January 1940 to April 1942
 The 53d Weather Reconnaissance Squadron, designated the 3d Reconnaissance Squadron, Weather, Heavy from January 1945 to June 1945
 The 3d Space Operations Squadron, designated the 3d Reconnaissance Squadron, Very Long Range (Photographic-RCM) and 3d Reconnaissance Squadron, Very Long Range, Photographic from September 1945 to March 1947

See also 
 3d Strategic Reconnaissance Squadron
 3d Tactical Reconnaissance Squadron
 3d Weather Reconnaissance Squadron